Sai Van Bridge is a cable-stayed bridge in Macau, China, inaugurated on December 19, 2004. It features a double-deck design, with an enclosed lower deck to be used in the event of strong typhoons when the other two bridges connecting Taipa and Macau Peninsula, namely Ponte Governador Nobre de Carvalho and Ponte de Amizade, are closed. Space is also reserved in the lower deck for the Macau Light Transit System, which is expected to start running across the bridge by 2024.

See also
 Transport in Macau

References

External links
MGTO – Sightseeing: Brief introduction to the bridge by Macau Government Tourist Office
Administrative Regulation No. 21/2005, "Sai Van Bridge Regulation" – in Chinese and in Portuguese via the official website of the Printing Bureau.

Sai Van
Sai Van
Sai Van
Transport in Macau
2004 establishments in Macau